Stephanie is a female name that comes from the Greek name Στέφανος (Stephanos) meaning "crown". The male form is Stephen. Forms of Stephanie in other languages include the German "Stefanie", the Italian, Czech, Polish, and Russian "Stefania", the Portuguese Estefânia (although the use of that version has become rare, and both the English and French versions are the ones commonly used), and the Spanish Estefanía. The form Stéphanie is from the French language, but Stephanie is now widely used both in English- and Spanish-speaking cultures.

Given names

Royalty
Stephanie, Queen of Navarre (died after 1066), Queen consort of king García Sánchez III of Navarre
Stephanie of Castile (died 1 July 1180), illegitimate daughter of Alfonso VII of León and Castile
 Stephanie of Milly, Lady of Oultrejordain (died 1197), an influential figure in the Kingdom of Jerusalem
 Stephanie of Milly, Lady of Gibelet, an influential figure in the Kingdom of Jerusalem, first cousin of the former
 Stephanie of Hohenzollern-Sigmaringen (1837–1859), consort queen of Portugal, married to King Pedro V
 Stéphanie de Beauharnais (1789–1860), French consort of Karl Ludwig Friedrich, Grand Duke of Baden
 Stephanie of Belgium (1864–1945), daughter of Leopold II of Belgium and wife of Rudolf, Crown Prince of Austria
 Stephanie, Princess zu Windisch-Graetz (1909–2005), Austrian artist, daughter of Archduchess Elisabeth of Austria
 Princess Stéphanie of Monaco (born 1965), youngest child of Grace Kelly and Prince Rainier of Monaco
 Stéphanie, Hereditary Grand Duchess of Luxembourg (born 1984), Belgian noble

Others
 Stephania (died 868), wife of Adrian II
 Stephanie (born 1987), American singer and actress
 Saint Stephanie, virgin and martyr in Amalfi, Italy, honored on September 18
 Stephanie Abrams (born 1978), global travel expert, radio & TV presenter, on-camera meteorologist on The Weather Channel 
 Stephanie Adams (1970–2018), American Playboy model and author
 Stephanie Aeffner (born 1976), German politician
 Stephanie "Stevvi" Alexander, American singer-songwriter and guitarist
 Stephanie Anne Mills (born 1979), Canadian actress
 Stephanie Arnold (born 1978), American athlete
 Stephanie Au (born 1992), Hong Kong competitive swimmer
 Stephanie Balduccini (born 2004), Brazilian swimmer
 Stephanie Brantz (born 1972), Australian sports presenter
 Stephanie Beacham (born 1947), British actress
 Stephanie Beard (born 1981), Canadian actress, voice actress and television and radio personality
 Stephanie Beatriz (born 1981), American actress
 Stephanie Bellars (born 1976), American professional wrestling valet
 Stephanie Bendixsen (born 1985), Australian television presenter and video game reviewer
 Stephanie Benson (born 1967), Ghanaian singer
 Stephanie Bentley (born 1963), American country music artist
 Stephanie Berto (born 1953), Canadian track and field athlete
 Stephanie Best (born 1969), American athlete
 Stephanie Birkitt (born 1975), American attorney, former assistant to David Letterman
 Stephanie J. Block (born 1972), American actress and singer
 Stephanie Blythe (born 1970), American mezzo-soprano opera singer and educator
 Stephanie Bond, (born 1981), New Zealander netball player
 Stephanie Booth (1946–2016), British business owner and hotelier
 Stephanie Cayo (born 1988), Peruvian actress, singer and songwriter
 Stephanie Chan (born 1957), Canadian para table tennis player
 Stephanie Che (born 1974), Hong Kong actress and singer
 Stephanie Cheng (born 1984), Hong Konger singer and starlet
 Stephanie Cmar (born 1985), American chef and Top Chef contestant
 Stephanie Cohen-Aloro (born 1983), French tennis player
 Stephanie Cole (born 1941), British actress
 Stephanie Dabney (1958–2022), American ballerina
 Stephanie D'Abruzzo (born 1971), American muppeteer
 Stephanie Davis (born 1993), English actress
 Stephanie de Zorzi (born 1993), Venezuelan model and beauty queen
 Stephanie Del Valle (born 1996), American and Puerto Rican musician, model, and pageant winner
 Stephanie Deshpande (born 1975), American artist
 Stephanie Dixon (born 1984), Canadian swimmer
 Stephanie Dosen (born 1973), American singer-songwriter and designer
 Stéphanie Douard (born 1979), French Paralympic swimmer
 Stefanie Draws (born 1989), German football defender
 Stephanie Fearon (born 1989), British singer and actress
 Stéphanie Félicité Ducrest de St-Albin, comtesse de Genlis (1746–1830), French writer and educator
 Stephanie Finochio, a.k.a. Trinity (born 1971), American stuntwoman and professional wrestling valet 
 Stephanie Forrester (born 1969), British triathlete
 Stefani Germanotta (born 1986), a.k.a. Lady Gaga, American recording artist, actress, and activist
 Stefanie Giesinger (born 1996), German model
 Stephanie Goldner (1896–1962), Austrian American harpist and the first female member of the New York Philharmonic in 1922
 Stefanie Maria "Steffi" Graf (born 1969), German tennis player, former World No. 1 woman tennis player
 Stephanie Graf (born 1973), former Austrian middle-distance athlete
 Stephanie Grebe (born 1987), German para table tennis player 
 Stefanie Hertel (born 1979), German yodeler, TV presenter, and popular performer of Alpine folk music
 Stephanie Hill (born 1995), English academic, singer, actress, model, dancer and beauty pageant titleholder
 Stephanie Ho (born 1992), Hong Kong singer, artist, former golfer
 Stephanie Hodge (born 1956), American actress and stand-up comic
 Stephanie Horner (born 1989), Canadian swimmer
 Stephanie Hsu (born 1990), American actress
 Stephanie Hwang, a.k.a. Tiffany (born 1989), Korean-American singer, a member of Korean pop group Girls' Generation
 Stephanie Jacobsen (born 1980), Hong Kong-born Australian actress
 Stephanie Jallen (born 1996), American skier
 Stephanie Jaramillo (born 1982), American retired professional boxer
 Stephanie Tubbs Jones (1949–2008), American politician, representative from Ohio
 Stefanie Joosten (born 1988), Dutch model, singer and actress
 Stephanie Kim (born 1987), American singer and ballerina, a member of The Grace
 Stephanie Klick (born 1956), American politician
 Stefanie Kloß, German singer 
 Stefanie Koch (born 1981), German ski mountaineer
 Stephanie Kurlow, Australian dancer
 Stephanie Kwolek (1923–2014), Polish-American chemist and the inventor of Kevlar
 Stephanie Land (born 1978), American writer and public speaker
 Stéphanie Lapointe (born 1984), Quebec singer and actress
 Stephanie Laurens (born 1953), Australian romance author
 Stefanie Lawton (born 1980), Canadian curler from Saskatchewan
 Stephanie Lee, Korean-American actor and model
 Stephanie Lemelin, American voice actress
 Stephanie Longfellow (born 1882-after 1907), American stage and film actress
 Stephanie Luzie (born 1974), German gothic metal singer
 Stephanie March (born 1974), American actress
 Stéphanie Mariage (born 1966), French para table tennis player
 Stephanie Pace Marshall (born 1945), American educator and founder of the Illinois Mathematics and Science Academy
 Stephanie McIntosh (born 1985), Australian actress
 Stephanie McMahon (born 1976), former occasional professional wrestler and current WWE executive
 Stephanie McMichael (born 1989), Big Brother 2008 contestant
 Stephanie Merritt (born 1974), English writer, author, and critic
 Stephenie Meyer (born 1973), American author and film producer
 Stéphanie Michelini, French actress
 Stephanie Miller (born 1961), American actress and radio talk show host
 Stephanie Mills (born 1957), American R&B, soul and gospel singer/songwriter
 Stephanie Millward (born 1981), British Paralympic swimmer
 Stefanie Mirlach, German football midfielder
 Nina Morato (née Stephanie Morato, born 1966), French singer
 Stephanie Morton (born 1990), Australian track cyclist
 Stephanie Nicks, also known as Stevie Nicks (born 1948), American singer and songwriter
 Stephanie Niznik (1967-2019), American actress
 Stephanie Norton (born 2000), Hong Kong sailor
 Stephanie Okwu (born 1994), Nigerian beauty queen
 Stephanie O'Sullivan (born 1959), American former national intelligence official
 Stephanie Park (born 1993), Canadian Paralympic wheelchair basketball player
 Stephanie Pakrul (born 1982), American blogger
 Stephanie Peacock (born 1986), British MP
 Stephanie Pohl (born 1978), German beach volleyball player 
 Stefanie Powers (born 1942), American actress
 Stefanie Preissner (born 1988), Irish writer and actress
 Stephanie Reid (born 1984), track and field paralympian who competes for Great Britain
 Stephanie Rice (born 1988), Australian swimmer
 Stephanie Riche, French Paralympic alpine skier
 Stefanie Ridel (born 1973), American singer, songwriter, and actress
 Stephanie Romanov (born 1969), American model and actress
 Stephanie Saland, American former ballet dancer and teacher
 Stephanie Herseth Sandlin (born 1970), American lawyer and politician, U.S. representative from South Dakota
 Stephanie Moulton Sarkis, American psychotherapist and author
 Stefanie Scott (born 1996), American actress
 Stephanie Schriock (born 1973), American political strategist
 Stephanie Schweitzer (born 1992), Australian athletics competitor
 Stephanie Seymour (born 1968), American model and actress
 Stephanie Sheh, (born 1977) American voice actor
 Stephanie Shipp, American economist and social statistician
 Stephanie Sigman, (born 1987), Mexican actress
 Stephanie Siriwardhana (born 1988), Sri Lankan-Lebanese model
 Stephanie Slater (born 1991), British Paralympic swimmer
 Stephanie Murray Smith (born 1987), American television personality, make-up artist, hairstylist, and beauty pageant titleholder
 Stephanie Storp (born 1968), German shot putter
 Stefanie Sun (born 1978), Singaporean popular singer
 Stephanie Tency (born 1990), Dutch actress, TV host, model and beauty pageant titleholder
 Stéphanie Tirode (born 1975), French female sport shooter
 Stephanie Trong (born 1976), American editor 
 Stephanie Waring (born 1978), English actress
 Stephanie Wells (born 1968), American jewelry designer
 Stephanie Wheeler (born 1981), American wheelchair basketball player
 Stephanie White (born 1977), American basketball player and coach
 Stephanie Wilson (born 1966), American astronaut
 Stephanie Ybarra, American theater producer and educator
 Stephanie Young, American voice actress and singer
 Stephanie Zacharek, American film critic 
 Stephanie Zammit, Maltese teacher, model and beauty pageant titleholder
 Stephanie Zimbalist (born 1956), American actress
 Stephanie Zvan, American activist, radio host, and author

Arts, entertainment, and media

Fictional entities

 Stephanie, a character in the TV series LazyTown
 Stephanie, character from Lego Friends
 Stephanie, a character in the animated series The Ridonculous Race
 Stéphanie, a character in the French film Rust and Bone
 Stephanie, a character in the film Zookeeper
 Stephanie Brown, a.k.a. Spoiler, costumed hero in DC Comics, part of the Batman Family
 Stephanie Crawford, a character in To Kill a Mockingbird by Harper Lee
 Steph Dean, nickname of Stephanie Dean, a character in UK soap opera Hollyoaks
 Stephanie Dola, a character from the anime series No Game No Life
 Stephanie Edgley, a character from the book series Skulduggery Pleasant
 Stephanie Forrester, a character on the CBS soap opera The Bold and the Beautiful
 Stefanie "Stef" Adams Foster, a character from the 2013 TV series The Fosters
 Stephanie Johnson, a character in the American soap opera Days of Our Lives
 Stephanie Knightleigh, a character from the children's books and animated TV series Edgar & Ellen
 Stephanie "Stevie" Lake, a character in the TV series The Saddle Club
 Stephanie Plum, bounty hunter and title character from the novel series by Janet Evanovich
 Stephanie Powell, a character in the TV series No Ordinary Family
 Stephanie Scully, a character in the TV series Neighbours
 Stephanie Smothers, a character in the film A Simple Favor
 Stephanie Speck, a character in the film Short Circuit (1986)
 Stephanie "Stef" Steinbrenner, a character in the film The Goonies
 Stephanie Tanner, a character on the TV series Full House
 Stephanie Vandergosh, a character in the film Better Luck Tomorrow
 Stephanie Vanderkellen, from the TV series Newhart
 Stephanie Zinone, a character in the film Grease 2

See also
 Stef
 Stefania (name)
 Steff
 Steph
 Stephan (given name)
 Stefan (given name)

References

English feminine given names
Given names
Lists of people by given name